William James Gaither (born March 28, 1936) is an American singer and songwriter of Southern gospel and contemporary Christian music. He has written numerous popular Christian songs with his wife Gloria; he is also known for performing as part of the Bill Gaither Trio and the Gaither Vocal Band. In the 1990s, his career gained a resurgence (as well as the careers of other southern gospel artists), as popularity grew for the Gaither Homecoming series.

Early life
Bill Gaither was born in Alexandria, Indiana, in 1936 to George and Lela Gaither. He formed his first group the Bill Gaither Trio (consisting of Bill, his sister Mary Ann (1945–2018), and brother Danny Gaither) in 1956 while a college student at Anderson College, to which he had transferred after one year at Taylor University. He graduated from Anderson in 1959 with a major in English and a minor in music, after which he worked as an English teacher. He married the former Gloria Sickal in 1962.

Gaither earned his masters degree from Ball State in 1961,Gaither entered into the fledgling Gospel Music Association, founded in 1964, and helped organize the first Dove Awards ceremony in 1969.

He tried for a few years to manage both a music career and his full-time teaching job, but he quit his teaching job in 1967 and worked full-time in the Christian music industry. He recorded his breakthrough song "He Touched Me" in 1964.

Gaither was influenced by Southern gospel singers such as Jake Hess and Hovie Lister and by groups such as the Speers, the Statesmen, and the Happy Goodmans.

Songwriter

Gaither and his wife, Gloria, have written many songs including: "The Longer I Serve Him," "Because He Lives," "The King Is Coming," "Sinner Saved By Grace", "Something Beautiful," "He Touched Me", "It Is Finished," "Jesus, There's Something About That Name" "I'm Gonna Sing", and "Let's Just Praise The Lord." His songs have been performed by Christian artists (David Crowder Band, Carman, The Imperials, Sandi Patty, The Cathedral Quartet, The Speers and the Heritage Singers), country singers (The Statler Brothers) and pop artists (Elvis Presley). A video of a man surreptitiously recorded playing "Jesus, There's Something About That Name" on a piano in his destroyed house was shared by many people following the Tornado outbreak of December 10–11, 2021.

Gloria Gaither often writes the lyrics while Bill writes the music, although composing is usually a collaborative project between the two. As of 2005, they had composed 600 songs and by 2012 that number had increased to over 700.

Performer

After graduating high school, Gaither took a job in 1955 at Worthington, Ohio's radio station WRFD as a member of the station's gospel quartet. Since Gaither first began singing with the Bill Gaither Trio in the 1950s, he has constantly been performing. The trio originally consisted of Bill, his brother Danny Gaither and his sister Mary Ann Gaither. In about 1964 Bill's wife, Gloria, took the place of Mary Ann. The trio sang traditional gospel songs along with original compositions by the Gaithers that gave them a more contemporary feel.

Gaither has a high bass voice (or low baritone), and often sang while playing piano with the Bill Gaither Trio.

Entrepreneurship and influence
Gaither founded the Gaither Music Company, which includes the functions of record company, concert booking (Gaither Management Group), television production, copyright management (Gaither Copyright Management), retail store, recording studio (Gaither Studios, formerly Pinebrook Studios) and telemarketing for the Gaither organization reside. He also ran the Gaither Family Resources retail center.

Included as part of the company is Live Bait Productions, an animation company run by Benjy Gaither, one of Bill's three children.

Record labels 
In the 1980s, Gaither was involved with Paragon Associates, which formed a partnership with Zondervan to buy Benson Records, which is now part of Sony BMG Music Entertainment.

In 1994, Gaither and entrepreneur Leland Boren founded the Brentwood, Tennessee-based Chapel Hill Music Group, which later changed its name to Spring Hill Music Group. It was created as part of the Gaither Music Company to handle in-house productions, including the Gaither Homecoming series.

Industry Influence 

Gaither has been a father figure and career booster to many younger performers in the Christian music industry, while helping to prolong the careers of those who came before him for example by producing Homecoming recordings and tours. The following are all CCM artists who either got their start or became popular while touring with the Gaithers: Mark Lowry, Michael W. Smith, Carman, Sandi Patty, Steve Green, Don Francisco, Amy Grant, Michael English, Jonathan Pierce, Karla Worley, and Cynthia Clawson.

He has maintained the Gaither Vocal Band with a variety of singers through the years, including Gary McSpadden, Steve Green, Lee Young, Jon Mohr, Larnelle Harris, Michael English, Lemuel Miller, Jim Murray, Mark Lowry, Terry Franklin, Buddy Mullins, Jonathan Pierce, Guy Penrod, David Phelps, Russ Taff, Marshall Hall, Wes Hampton, Adam Crabb, Todd Suttles and Reggie Smith. Penrod, Lowry and Hampton were the members of the Gaither Vocal Band with the longest tenure besides Bill Gaither himself. Penrod was with the group from 1995 to 2008; Lowry from 1988 to 2001; and Hampton has been with the Gaither Vocal Band since 2005. It was announced in January 2009 that Lowry, English and Phelps were rejoining the group; at the same time the announcement was made that Penrod and Hall were leaving to pursue solo careers.

Gaither's Homecoming tours, which started in 1991, brought together major stars of the southern gospel and CCM industry, sparking a revival of the genres. The tours have sold more than 1.1 million tickets across the world, and have included such notable venues as the Kennedy Center and Carnegie Hall. Pollstar listed the tour as selling more tickets in 2004 than Elton John, Fleetwood Mac or Rod Stewart. Lynda Randle, the Isaacs, Russ Taff, the Hoppers, Jessy Dixon and many more have performed on the tours.

Personal life

Bill and Gloria live in Alexandria, Indiana, and have three grown children.

Discography

Gaither Trio

Solo
2005: Bill Gaither

Gaither Vocal Band

Homecoming Series

Bibliography
(This list excludes books of music and books that are companions to his "Homecoming" series.)
2003: Gaither, Bill and Ken Abraham. It's More than Music: Life Lessons on Friends, Faith, and What Matters Most. Anderson, Indiana: Warner Books.
1992: Gaither, Bill and Jerry Jerkins. I Almost Missed the Sunset. Thomas Nelson (pub)..
1997: Gaither, Bill and Jerry Jerkins. Homecoming. Zondervan.
2000: Gaither, Bill and Gloria Gaither. God Gave Song. Zondervan.

Awards and honors

Grammy Awards
1973: Best Inspirational Performance for "Let's Just Praise The Lord"; Bill Gaither Trio
1975: Best Inspirational Performance for "Jesus, We Just Want To Thank You"; Bill Gaither Trio
1991: Best Southern Gospel Album for Homecoming; Gaither Vocal Band
1999: Best Southern, Country, Or Bluegrass Gospel Album for Kennedy Center Homecoming
2001: Best Southern, Country, or Bluegrass Gospel Album for A Billy Graham Music Homecoming
2008: Best Southern, Country, Or Bluegrass Gospel Album for Lovin' Life; Gaither Vocal Band

GMA Dove Awards
1969, 1970, 1972–'77: Songwriter of the Year
1974: Song of the Year for "Because He Lives"
1976: Inspirational Album of the Year for Jesus, We Just Want to Thank You; Bill Gaither Trio
1978: Inspirational Album of the Year for Pilgrim's Progress; Bill Gaither Trio
1980: Mixed Group of the Year – Bill Gaither Trio
1986: Praise and Worship Album of the Year for I’ve Just Seen Jesus (choral)
1987: Southern Gospel Album of the Year for The Master Builder; The Cathedrals (producer)
1991: Southern Gospel Album of the Year for Climbing Higher & Higher; The Cathedrals (producer)
1992: Southern Gospel Album of the Year for Homecoming Gaither Vocal Band
1993: Southern Gospel Album of the Year for Reunion: A Gospel Homecoming Celebration
1994: Southern Gospel Album of the Year for Southern Classics; Gaither Vocal Band
1994: Southern Gospel Song of the Year for "Satisfied"; Gaither Vocal Band
1995: Southern Gospel Song of the Year for "I Bowed On My Knees"
1999: Southern Gospel Album of the Year for Still the Greatest Story Ever Told; Gaither Vocal Band
1995: Southern Gospel Song of the Year for "I Believe in a Hill Called Mount Calvary"; Gaither Vocal Band
2000: Southern Gospel Album of the Year for God is Good; Gaither Vocal Band
2001: Southern Gospel Album of the Year for I Do Believe; Gaither Vocal Band
2001: Southern Gospel Song of the Year for "God Is Good All The Time"; Gaither Vocal Band
2001: Long Form Video of the Year for A Farewell Celebration; The Cathedrals (producer)
2002: Southern Gospel Album of the Year for Encore; Old Friends Quartet (producer)
2002: Southern Gospel Song of the Year for "He's Watching Me"; Gaither Vocal Band
2007: Southern Gospel Album of the Year for Give It Away; Gaither Vocal Band
2007: Southern Gospel Song of the Year for "Give It Away"; Gaither Vocal Band
2009: Southern Gospel Album of the Year for Lovin' Life; Gaither Vocal Band
2010: Southern Gospel Album of the Year for Reunited; Gaither Vocal Band
2010: Long Form Video of the Year for A Gospel Journey; Oak Ridge Boys (producer)
2011: Southern Gospel Song of the Year for "Better Day"; Gaither Vocal Band
2011: Southern Gospel Album of the Year for Greatly Blessed; Gaither Vocal Band

Other honors
1974, 1980: ASCAP Best Gospel Song of the Year
 1983: Inducted into the Gospel Music Association Hall of Fame
1997: Named among the top 75 American entrepreneurs: Entrepreneur Magazine
1997: Inducted into the SGMA Hall of Fame
2000: Christian "Songwriter of the Century" (with Gloria Gaither): American Society of Composers and Publishers (ASCAP)
2006: SPEBSQSA Honorary Life Member
2010: Indiana Wesleyan University Society of World Changers inductee and honorary doctorate recipient
2012: Concert Promotor of the Year: NQC Music Awards

References

External links

Short biography at jjonline.com
[ Bill Gaither on Allmusic.com]
Interview with Bill Gaither on about.com 
Profile on CanadianChristianity.com
Gaither Family Resources

1936 births
Living people
20th-century American singers
20th-century Christians
21st-century American singers
21st-century Christians
20th-century American composers
21st-century American composers
American Christian hymnwriters
American gospel singers
American male singer-songwriters
Anderson University (Indiana) alumni
Gospel music composers
Gospel music pianists
Grammy Award winners
Members of the Church of God (Anderson, Indiana)
Record producers from Indiana
People from Alexandria, Indiana
Southern gospel performers
American male non-fiction writers
American male pianists
20th-century American pianists
21st-century American pianists
20th-century American male singers
21st-century American male singers
Singer-songwriters from Indiana